BSS Industrial is a British specialist distributor of heating, ventilation, pipeline and mechanical services equipment, based in Leicester. The business was previously part of The BSS Group plc until the group's acquisition by the Travis Perkins Group in 2010. The purchase was announced in July 2010.

History
The company was founded in the East Midlands in 1899 as British Steam Specialties. Acquisitions have included specialist valve distributors Pegler & Louden in December 2003.

Other acquisitions by BSS Group include UBM Cadel (rebranded as PTS) in 1999, Price Tools in 2006, Buck & Hickman in 2007 (subsequently sold in 2011 by the new owners of BSS),Birchwood Products in 2008, Direct Heating Spares in 2009, and UGS, a privately owned underground drainage merchants, in 2010.

The board of BSS accepted an indicative £553 million takeover offer from Travis Perkins on 28 May 2010. The acquisition was completed on 14 December 2010, when BSS Group shares were delisted from the London Stock Exchange.

Operations
BSS Industrial is a supplier of pipeline, process, heating and mechanical services equipment. Its customers range from large national contractors to small, local independents. The company's primary route to market is via a nationwide network of 63 branches.

References

Companies formerly listed on the London Stock Exchange
Companies based in Leicester
Wholesalers of the United Kingdom
Business services companies established in 1899
1899 establishments in England
2010 mergers and acquisitions